Francis Adriano (born September 24, 1975) is a Filipino professional basketball player who last played for the Pasig Sta. Lucia Realtors of the Maharlika Pilipinas Basketball League (MPBL). Drafted 6th overall by Sta. Lucia in 2001, he started his pro career with the now-defunct Metropolitan Basketball Association. He also played in the Philippine Basketball Association and ASEAN Basketball League.

Player profile
Adriano won his first championship with Sta. Lucia. He is an aggressive defender outside the paint. He was part of the Larry Fonacier trade which brought him to Red Bull Barako. He played 22 games with the San Miguel Beermen in the 2006–07 PBA Philippine Cup and averaged 4.0 points per game. His career high was 29 points in game six of the 2007–08 PBA Philippine Cup semifinals on a 123–97 win against the Purefoods Tender Juicy Giants. He shot 3 out of 4 in three point field goals, 7 out of 10 in two point field goals and a perfect 6 out of 6 in the free throw line.

References

External links
Player Profile 
PBA-Online Profile

1975 births
Living people
Barako Bull Energy Boosters players
Basketball players from Metro Manila
Filipino expatriate basketball people in Indonesia
People from Pasig
Philippine Patriots players
Philippines men's national basketball team players
Filipino men's basketball players
San Miguel Beermen players
Shooting guards
Sta. Lucia Realtors players
FEU Tamaraws basketball players
Sta. Lucia Realtors draft picks